Desmond Hughson (born 27 May 1941) is an Australian cricketer. He played in fourteen first-class matches for Queensland between 1959 and 1969.

See also
 List of Queensland first-class cricketers

References

External links
 

1941 births
Living people
Australian cricketers
Queensland cricketers
Cricketers from Brisbane